Mar West is an album by American guitarist Tony Rice, released in 1980. It is credited to the Tony Rice Unit.

Mar West was reissued in 1987 along with Still Inside as Devlin minus the song "Mar East".

Track listing 
All songs by Tony Rice unless otherwise indicated.
 "Mar West" – 5:31
 "Nardis" (Miles Davis) – 3:47
 "Waltz For Indira" – 3:21
 "Neon Tetra" – 4:25
 "Is That So" – 4:26
 "Whoa Baby, Every Day I Wake Up With The Blues" – 3:56
 "Mar East" – 4:38
 "Untitled As Of Yet" – 4:24

Personnel 
 Tony Rice – guitar, vocals
 Sam Bush – mandolin
 Richard Greene – violin
 Mike Marshall – mandolin
 Todd Phillips – bass
Production notes
 Tony Rice - producer
 Bill Wolf - engineer
 Greg Fulginiti - mastering

References 

1980 albums
Tony Rice albums
Rounder Records albums